Florient Rise (formerly Cherry Street Project) is a private housing estate in Cherry Street, Tai Kok Tsui, Yau Tsim Mong District, Kowloon, Hong Kong near Olympic station. It was jointly developed by Nan Fung Group and Urban Renewal Authority (URA) in 2008 and completed the construction in May 2009. It comprises three blocks with a total of 522 units.

History
The Cherry Street Project was among the first batch of redevelopment projects announced by the controversial Urban Renewal Authority (URA) following its 2001 establishment. The site was previously home to old mixed-use buildings. All former residents were evicted. The URA partners with private developers to carry out redevelopment projects. On 22 July 2004, the project was awarded to Nan Fung Development, who beat out eight other developers.

Features
The estate has three residential blocks offering a total of 522 flats.

It also includes a children's-themed shopping centre called "West 9 Zone".

Education
Florient Rise is in Primary One Admission (POA) School Net 32. Within the school net are multiple aided schools (operated independently but funded with government money) and Tong Mei Road Government Primary School (塘尾道官立小學).

Hoi Ming Court incident
There is a residential block called "Hoi Ming Court" in the middle of the construction site of the Cherry Street Project, but Hoi Ming Court was excluded from the redevelopment project due to its young age. Nan Fung Development, one of the project's property developers, tried to acquire the block for the whole redevelopment. However, both Nan Fung and URA thought that the acquisition cost raised by flat owners was too high and finally gave up the acquisition plan. Hoi Ming Court was left in place and Florient Rise was built around Hoi Ming Court.

References

Private housing estates in Hong Kong
Tai Kok Tsui
Residential buildings completed in 2009
Nan Fung Group
2009 establishments in China